Vagabonds (German: Vagabunden) is a 1949 Austrian drama film directed by Rolf Hansen and starring Paula Wessely, Attila Hörbiger and Adrienne Gessner. The film's premiere was attended by the President Karl Renner and members of the government. It was shot at Salzburg Studios and on location in the city. The film's sets were designed by the art director Julius von Borsody. It was released in West Germany on 3 March 1950	by Bavaria Film. It is also known by the alternative title 	Vagabunden der Liebe.

Cast
 Paula Wessely as 	Dr. Elisabeth Kamma
 Attila Hörbiger as 	Dr. Peter Kamma
 Adrienne Gessner as 	Mademoiselle Belet
 Elfe Gerhart as Gaby Elder 
 Erik Frey as Dr. Christian Heßler
 Karl Ehmann as 	Mattek
 Siegfried Breuer as 	Andy Karr
 Helli Servi as 	Fräulein Fuchs
 Alma Seidler as 	Eine Mutter
 Mimi Stelzer as Frau Vösler
 Hilde Schultz-Pfaudler as 	Tante Olga
 Hermann Erhardt as 	Professor Kramer
 Oskar Wegrostek as Ein Vater
 Karl Schwetter as 	Dr. Eibl	
 Kurt Heintel as 	Ulmansky

References

Bibliography 
 Fritsche, Maria. Homemade Men in Postwar Austrian Cinema: Nationhood, Genre and Masculinity. Berghahn Books, 2013.

External links 
 

1949 films
Austrian drama films
1949 drama films
1940s German-language films
Films directed by Rolf Hansen
Austrian black-and-white films
Sascha-Film films
Bavaria Film films